Robert Fife (born 1954) is a Canadian political journalist and author who was the Ottawa bureau chief for CTV News from February 2005. Since January 2016, Fife has served as Ottawa bureau chief for The Globe and Mail.

Before his stint at CTV, Fife was also Ottawa bureau chief for CanWest News Service, the National Post, and the Sun Media chain. At CTV, he was the host of its Question Period show, a political panel discussion; after Fife's move to The Globe and Mail was announced, it was also stated that the show would be rebranded CTV’s Question Period with The Globe and Mail’s Robert Fife. He broke the news of the Canadian Senate expenses scandal with his reporting on Mike Duffy and Nigel Wright.

Fife disclosed the Canadian government's C$10.5 million settlement with Omar Khadr. He also was part of a team of three (together with Steven Chase and Sean Fine), who first broke the story of the SNC-Lavalin Affair

Biography
Fife is a native of Chapleau, Ontario. He has been covering national politics since 1978, when he began his career in the parliamentary bureau of News Radio. He moved to United Press International of Canada in 1983.

Fife worked as a senior political correspondent for The Canadian Press from 1984 to 1987. He spent a decade as the Ottawa bureau chief for Sun Media where he also wrote a regular column. In 1998, Fife joined the National Post as its Ottawa bureau Chief. In 2002, he became the bureau chief for both the National Post and CanWest News Services. In 2005, Fife became Ottawa bureau chief for CTV News.

Fife served as the executive producer of CTV News Channel's daily political show Power Play with Don Martin.

On May 14, 2013, he broke the news that Nigel Wright, then Chief of Staff to Prime Minister Stephen Harper had written a $90,000 cheque to cover the questionable Senate expenses of Mike Duffy.

On November 19, 2015, it was announced that starting 1 January 2016, Fife was moving on from his role as Ottawa bureau chief for CTV News to serve the same role for The Globe and Mail. Fife is currently the host of CTV's political panel show Question Period, which will be renamed CTV’s Question Period with The Globe and Mail's Robert Fife in 2016.

Awards
 National Newspaper Citation of Merit, Political Reporting 2004
 National Newspaper Citation of Merit, Breaking News 2002
 Edward Dunlop Award for Spot News, 1997

Books

 Kim Campbell: The Making of a Politician (1993)
 A Capital Scandal: Politics, Patronage and Payoff — Why Parliament Must Be Reformed (with John Warren, 1991)

References

Canadian television reporters and correspondents
Canadian non-fiction writers
Writers from Ontario
Living people
People from Chapleau, Ontario
Place of birth missing (living people)
National Post people
Canadian political journalists
1954 births
CTV Television Network people